Uştal is a village and municipality in the Ismayilli District of Azerbaijan. It has a population of 440. The village had an Armenian population before the exodus of Armenians from Azerbaijan after the outbreak of the Nagorno-Karabakh conflict.

References

External links 

Populated places in Ismayilli District